Tamás Kovács (born 18 September 1983 in Hódmezővásárhely) is a Hungarian long-distance runner. He competed in the marathon at the 2012 Summer Olympics, placing 72nd with a time of 2:27:48.

Kovacs has a career best of 2:14:23 in the marathon, which he set in Italy in 2011. He has also run under 1:04 twice in the half marathon.

Kovacs attended High Point University in North Carolina, USA, where he competed in cross country and track & field from 2005-08. He set HPU records in the 3,000-meter, 5,000-meter and 10,000-meter and was 2008 Big South Conference champion in the 10,000-meter.

References

1983 births
Living people
Hungarian male long-distance runners
Olympic athletes of Hungary
Athletes (track and field) at the 2012 Summer Olympics
People from Hódmezővásárhely
Sportspeople from Csongrád-Csanád County
21st-century Hungarian people